Page to Screen is an American documentary television series hosted by Peter Gallagher, and narrated by David Hibbard. The series premiered October 28, 2002 on Bravo. Page to Screen explores the process of translating novels into films.

Episodes

Reception
Laura Miller of The New York Times called it "one of the most literate documentary series around".

References

External links
 

2000s American documentary television series
2002 American television series debuts
2005 American television series endings
Bravo (American TV network) original programming
English-language television shows